The Lomme, Lhomme or L'Homme is a river in the Ardennes, in the Walloon region of Belgium. It is a right tributary to the river Lesse, itself a right tributary of the river Meuse.

Geography
Its source is located on the plateau of Saint-Hubert. It passes through the villages of Poix-Saint-Hubert, Smuid, Mirwart, Grupont, Lesterny, Forrières, Jemelle, and the town of Rochefort, where it carved the Lorette cave. It joins the Lesse river at Éprave. It has one of the greatest drops in elevation of all rivers in Belgium. Its clear waters are home to a large population of fish, and the river is a popular location for trout fishing.

Rivers of the Ardennes (Belgium)
Rivers of Belgium
Rivers of Namur (province)
Rivers of Luxembourg (Belgium)
Rochefort, Belgium